Locust Grove, also known as the Goodwin Farm, is a historic home located at Rapidan, Culpeper County, Virginia. The original section was built about 1730, and expanded in at least four major building campaigns over the next half-century.  It had its present configuration by 1840.  The house is a -story, four bay, log and frame structure featuring a central chimney, two-room plan main block flanked by early gable-end lean-tos and rear additions.  It has a steep gable roof with modern dormers. It was renovated in the 1970s.  Also on the property is a contributing mid-19th century smokehouse.

It was listed on the National Register of Historic Places in 1985.

References

Houses on the National Register of Historic Places in Virginia
Houses completed in 1730
Houses in Culpeper County, Virginia
National Register of Historic Places in Culpeper County, Virginia